Alcon Entertainment, LLC is an American film production company, founded in 1997 by film producers Broderick Johnson and Andrew Kosove.  Since its establishment, Alcon Entertainment has developed and financed films that are ultimately distributed – in the United States mostly, and internationally on occasion – by Warner Bros. Pictures, following a ten-year motion picture production agreement.

Company 
Alcon Entertainment was established in January 23, 1997, and founded by film producers Broderick Johnson and Andrew Kosove, who are the co-CEOs of the company. The company is headquartered on Santa Monica Boulevard in Los Angeles, California. Both Johnson and Kosove presented FedEx founder and chairman Frederick W. Smith with a proposal suggesting that an independent film company, backed by a capitalized individual or company, and aligned with a major studio for an exclusive distribution arrangement would reap profits on copyrighted assets over a set period of time. On February 18, 1998, Alcon Entertainment set up two greenlight projects, with Warner Bros. distributing a single project. On May 15, 1998, Alcon inked a second deal with Warner Bros. in which Warner was allowed to distribute the film Lost & Found.

Alcon's first major feature film was the 1999 comedy Lost & Found. In March 2000, following the success of its second film My Dog Skip, Alcon entered into a long-term distribution agreement with Warner Bros. The agreement had Warner Bros. in charge of worldwide distribution of a minimum of 10 films produced and financed by Alcon over the next five years. The agreement also allowed Warner Bros. to co-finance certain pictures with Alcon. Alcon and Warner Bros. signed a new agreement in February 2006, continuing their eight-year relationship, under which Warner Bros. would continue to distribute feature films developed and financed by Alcon. WB and Alcon extended the deal in 2015 which ended in 2019. On September 28, 2003, Alcon Entertainment had launched its television arm, with an exclusive co-production agreement at television studio Warner Bros. Television.

In 2011, Alcon Entertainment acquired the entire brand and rights to the Blade Runner franchise, which encompasses movies, series, games and other franchise media such as books. On March 8, 2012, Alcon had inked an affiliate production company headed by 2S Films executive Molly Smith, Belle Pictures, to develop film projects.

Filmography

Alcon Television Group

Music
In 2014, Alcon partnered with Sleeping Giant Media to form ASG Music Group. ASG is a full service music company and record label. In 2017, ASG released the Blade Runner 2049 soundtrack, produced by Grammy nominated producer Michael Hodges, Kayla Morrison and Ashley Culp, with Epic Records. The Album reached No. 1 on the Billboard Soundtrack Sales Charts.

References

External links 
 

Companies based in Los Angeles
Film production companies of the United States
Mass media companies established in 1997
American independent film studios